Showdown at Shea was the name given to three professional wrestling events presented by the World Wide Wrestling Federation (WWWF), and then World Wrestling Federation (WWF), at Flushing, New York's Shea Stadium. The events were held in 1972, 1976, and 1980.

Event results

1972

 During the main event George Steele came to Ringside

1976 
This event featured the telecast of Muhammad Ali vs. Antonio Inoki fight from Tokyo, Japan.

1980 

In January 2019 the match between Antonio Inoki and Larry Sharpe was uploaded to the WWE Network.

See also 
 History of WWE

References

External links 
 Wrestling Information Archive
 Wrestling Supercards and Tournaments

1972 in New York City
1972 in professional wrestling
1976 in New York City
1976 in professional wrestling
1980 in New York City
1980 in professional wrestling
20th century in Queens
WWE shows
Events in New York City
Professional wrestling in New York City